Bannai is a script form of the Islamic calligraphy. It was used primarily in Iran in building inscriptions. It is a kind of angular Kufic script, which has geometric forms like square, rhombus, rectangular, parallel and crossed lines. The foundation of Bannai script is the horizontal and vertical directions of the lines, which have equal thickness and completely fill the geometrical form.

See also
 Labyrinth
 Maze

References 

Islamic calligraphy